The Launceston Tennis International is a professional tennis tournament played on outdoor hardcourts. It is part of the ITF Women's Circuit and has been held in Launceston, Australia, since 2012. In 2014, it was upgraded to a $50k event. In 2018, it returned to a $25k category event, before upgrading to a $60k event in 2019.

From 2015, the Launceston Tennis International will add an ATP Challenger tournament to the ITF Pro Circuit women’s event.

Past finals

Men's singles

Men's doubles

Women's singles

Women's doubles

References

External links
 

ATP Challenger Tour
ITF Women's World Tennis Tour
Tennis tournaments in Australia
Recurring sporting events established in 2012
Launceston Tennis International
Tennis in Tasmania
Hard court tennis tournaments